Weingut Schloss Sommerhausen is a traditional winery located in Sommerhausen
Germany and founded in 1435.

The founder Schenk Konrad IV of Limpurg started with construction of the Schlosskeller. Weingut Schloss Sommerhausen is a member of the Verband Deutscher Prädikatsweingüter (VDP). The production has been operating by the Steinmann family in Sommerhausen for 14 generations, each is documented to the year 1557. The products are:

30% Burgunder
25% Silvaner
20% Riesling
25% other sorts.

See also 
List of oldest companies

References

External links 
  

Sommerhausen
Vineyards of Germany
Companies established in the 15th century
15th-century establishments in the Holy Roman Empire